Lee Tae-Woo (born 8 January 1984) is a South Korean football player who currently plays for Korea National League side Suwon City FC. He has spent his career at Daegu FC in the K-League.

External links 
 K-League Player Record 

1984 births
Living people
Association football midfielders
South Korean footballers
Daegu FC players
K League 1 players
Korea National League players